KYCT (92.7 FM, "92.7 The Outlaw") is a commercial radio station licensed in Shasta Lake, California and serves the Redding, California and Anderson, California areas. KYCT airs a classic country music format.

The station signed on the air in 2017 and was branded as "Kat Country 92.7 FM". Then sometime in early 2018, KYCT changed their branding to "92.7 The Outlaw" to match sister station KHEX in Chico, California and went more towards a classic country format rather than modern country.

External links

YCT (FM)